"Precious Little Diamond" is a 1984 song by the Dutch Euro disco group Fox the Fox. It's the sixth track on the album In The Dark Of The Nite. Playing at 5:12 on the album and 7:29 on 12" it is the longest song produced by Fox the Fox.

The single peaked as number 11 on the Dutch singles Chart, staying on the chart for 7 weeks. In Germany and the US it peaked at number 5.

The track 
Dieter Bohlen has been cited with this song as the inspiration for using falsetto choruses in his songs, such as Modern Talking, C.C. Catch and Blue System. In 2013, the song was sampled in The Weeknd's song "Wanderlust", on his album Kiss Land. The Weeknd samples the melody, the original chorus and a part of the original lyrics.

Charts

Weekly charts

Year-end charts

References

1984 songs
Fox the Fox songs